Black soil may refer to:
               
 Chernozem, fertile black soils found in eastern Europe, Russia, India and the Canadian prairies
 Muck (soil), a soil made up primarily of humus from drained swampland
 Vertisol, dark cracking soils with a high clay content found between 50° N and 45° S of the equator
 Terra preta, "black earth" or soil of the Amazon river basin

See also
 Black Earth (disambiguation)